Plashetts railway station is a closed stone built railway station that served the mining hamlet of Plashetts, in Northumberland, England, which is now beneath the surface of Kielder Water.

History

The first section of the route was opened between Hexham and Chollerford in 1858, the remainder opening in stages until completion 1862. The line was closed to passengers by British Railways in 1956.

The station had a single platform and a tall signal box. This was a fairly substantial station having a waggonway branch, which ran from here up Slater's incline, to the Plashetts and Far Colliery. To the north of the station were one or two houses and at the end of the waggonway a miners' village.

The station is now submerged beneath Kielder Water.

References

External links
Plashetts Station on a navigable 1955 O. S. map

Disused railway stations in Northumberland
Former North British Railway stations
Railway stations in Great Britain opened in 1861
Railway stations in Great Britain closed in 1958
1861 establishments in England